Stereomerus hovorei is a species of beetle in the family Cerambycidae. It was described by Martins and Galileo in 2006. It is known from western Ecuador.

References

Desmiphorini
Beetles described in 2006